Following are lists of members of the Australian Capital Territory Legislative Assembly:

Members of the Australian Capital Territory Legislative Assembly, 1989–1991
Members of the Australian Capital Territory Legislative Assembly, 1992–1995
Members of the Australian Capital Territory Legislative Assembly, 1995–1998
Members of the Australian Capital Territory Legislative Assembly, 1998–2001
Members of the Australian Capital Territory Legislative Assembly, 2001–2004
Members of the Australian Capital Territory Legislative Assembly, 2004–2008
Members of the Australian Capital Territory Legislative Assembly, 2008–2012
Members of the Australian Capital Territory Legislative Assembly, 2012–2016
Members of the Australian Capital Territory Legislative Assembly, 2016–2020
Members of the Australian Capital Territory Legislative Assembly, 2020–2024

External links 
Members details